Zamavus “Zama” Magudulela is a South African actor and singer who performed the role of Rafiki in the Paris and Madrid productions of The Lion King musical.

Early life and education 
Magudulela grew up in Durban and started singing at the age of nine. She was a member of the local gospel choir Umlazi before joining the choir at her college, aged 12.

She has a degree in management and marketing.

Career 
Magudulela's first acting job was in Mbongeni Ngema's production of The Zulu Show and then as a backing singer in for Ngema's albums Isimukanandwendwe and Baba kaMdudu.

She worked as a backing singer for Busi Mhlongo before auditioning for The Lion King musical in Melbourne in 2003 and becoming the understudy for the Rafiki shaman character.

In 2006, she joined The Lion King cast in Hamburg, still as the Rafiki understudy, and later joined the Paris cast as the Rafiki main character.

She features in the 2007 recording of the Paris production.

She later performed at Rafiki in the Madrid production of the musical.

From 2019 Magudulela worked as a vocalist at Cirque du Soleil on their production of Totem.

References 

People from Durban
South African stage actresses
South African singers
21st-century South African women singers
Living people
Cirque du Soleil performers
Year of birth missing (living people)